SRK refers to Shah Rukh Khan, an Indian actor.

SRK may also refer to:
 Sark, a Channel Island, Chapman code
 Central Association of the Finnish Associations of Peace, a religious body
 Siorapaluk Heliport (IATA code)
 Serudung language (ISO 639 code)
 Skills, Rules, Knowledge framework in ecological interface design
 Shaking rat Kawasaki, a strain of laboratory rat